The Journal of Biomedical Optics is a monthly peer-reviewed scientific journal published by SPIE. It covers the application of optical technology to health care, biomedical research, and experimental medicine. The editor-in-chief is Brian W. Pogue (Dartmouth College).

Abstracting and indexing
This journal is abstracted and indexed in:

According to the Journal Citation Reports, the journal has a 2014 impact factor of 2.859, ranking it 12th out of 86 journals in the category "Optics", 31st out of 79 journals in the category "Biochemical Research Methods", and 31st out of 125 journals in the category "Radiology, Nuclear Medicine & Medical Imaging".

References

External links 
 

SPIE academic journals
Radiology and medical imaging journals
Optics journals
Publications established in 1996
Monthly journals
English-language journals
Biomedical engineering journals